The 1998 Regal Scottish Open was a professional ranking snooker tournament, that was held in February 1998 at the AECC, Aberdeen, Scotland.
 
Ronnie O'Sullivan won the tournament by defeating John Higgins nine frames to five in the final. The defending champion, Stephen Hendry, was defeated in the last 16 by Marcus Campbell.


Main draw

Final

References

Scottish Open (snooker)
1998 in snooker
1998 in Scottish sport
Sports competitions in Aberdeen